Events from the year 1250 in Ireland.

Incumbent
Lord: Henry

Events
Leap Castle in County Offaly, was built in by the O'Bannon family and was originally called "Leim ui Bhanain," or "Leap of the O'Bannons."

Births

Deaths

References

 
1250s in Ireland
Ireland
Years of the 13th century in Ireland